The Velorama is the only bicycle museum in the Netherlands. It is located at the Waalkade in the city of Nijmegen.

The museum was founded in 1981 from the private collection of G.F. Moed. In three storeys it shows about 250 exhibits from nearly two centuries. The Velorama owns a large collection of bicycle literature and also preserves the historic archive of the Dutch bicycle manufacturer Gazelle.

See also 
 List of bicycle and human powered vehicle museums

External links 

 Velorama website

Bicycle museums
Transport museums in the Netherlands
Museums established in 1981
1981 establishments in the Netherlands
Cycling in Nijmegen
Museums in Nijmegen
20th-century architecture in the Netherlands